Anna Komnene or Comnena may refer to:
 Anna Komnene (1 December 1083 – 1153), daughter of Alexios I Komnenos.
 Anna Komnene Angelina (c. 1176 – 1212), Empress of Nicaea
 Anna Komnene Doukaina (d. 4 January 1286), known in French as Agnes, Princess-consort of the Principality of Achaea.
 Anna Megale Komnene (6 April 1357 - after 30 November 1406), Queen consort of Georgia